Crashin' A Party is the second single by American R&B singer and rapper Lumidee, from her debut album Almost Famous (2003).

Track listing

European CD single

German 12" vinyl

Charts

Weekly charts

References

Lumidee songs
Songs written by Lumidee
2003 singles
2003 songs
Songs written by N.O.R.E.
Universal Records singles